Liza may refer to

 Liza (name), including a list of people named Liza
 Liza (fish), a genus of mullets
 Liza (1972 film), a 1972 Italian film
 Liza (1978 film), a 1978 Malayalam horror film
 Hurricane Liza (disambiguation), the name of four tropical cyclones in the Eastern Pacific Ocean
 "Liza (All the Clouds'll Roll Away)", a 1929 song by George Gershwin, Ira Gershwin and Gus Kahn
 Zapadnaya Liza, a river in northern Russia near Murmansk
 Liza Alert nonprofit search-and-rescue volunteer organization

See also
 Eliza (disambiguation)
Lizza (disambiguation)